Genchovtsi may refer to the following places in Bulgaria:

 Genchovtsi, Gabrovo, village in Gabrovo municipality, Gabrovo Province
 Genchovtsi, Tryavna, village in Tryavna municipality, Gabrovo Province